The magistrate of Hualien is the chief executive of the government of Hualien County in Taiwan. This list includes directly elected magistrates of the county. The incumbent Magistrate of the county is Hsu Chen-wei of Kuomintang since 25 December 2018.

Directly elected County Magistrates

Timeline

References

External links 
 Magistrates - Hualien County Government 

 
Hualien